Carpina is a city in Pernambuco, Brazil. Its economy is based on commerce and footwear industry. Its current mayor is Manoel Botafogo.

Geography
 State - Pernambuco
 Region - Zona da mata Pernambucana
 Boundaries - Tracunhaém, Buenos Aires  and Nazaré da Mata  (N);  Lagoa do Itaenga and Lagoa do Carro  (S);  Limoeiro  (W); Paudalho   (E)
 Area - 146.1 km2
 Elevation - 184 m
 Hydrography - Capibaribe and Goiana rivers
 Vegetation - Subcaducifólia forest
 Climate - Hot tropical and humid
 Annual average temperature - 23.3 c
 Distance to Recife - 50 km

Economy
The main economic activities in Carpina are based in the footwear industry, commerce and agriculture especially sugarcane.

Economic indicators

Economy by Sector
2006

Health indicators

Notable people
Jaílson França Braz, footballer
Aguinaldo Silva, writer and director

References

Municipalities in Pernambuco